Donald Edgar Tewes (August 4, 1916 – August 29, 2012) was an American businessman and a Republican member of the United States House of Representatives for Wisconsin. He represented Wisconsin's 2nd congressional district in the 85th United States Congress from January 3, 1957 to January 3, 1959.

Biography
Born in Merrill, Wisconsin, Tewes graduated from Merrill High School. In 1938, Tewes graduated from Valparaiso University in Valparaiso, Indiana and two years later graduated from the University of Wisconsin Law School being admitted to the Wisconsin Bar. Tewes practiced law in Merrill. During World War II, Tewes served in the United States Army Air Forces, as an intelligence officer in the Flying Tigers, in the China-Burma-India Theater. After the war, he was president of the Tewes Plastic Corporation in Waukesha, Wisconsin, retiring in 1994. Tewes voted in favor of the Civil Rights Act of 1957. In 1958, Tewes was defeated, while seeking reelection to Congress. In the 1960 election, Tewes was also defeated, while seeking election again to his former house seat.
He died on August 29, 2012 in Waukesha, Wisconsin.

Notes

External links

1916 births
2012 deaths
People from Merrill, Wisconsin
Politicians from Waukesha, Wisconsin
Valparaiso University alumni
University of Wisconsin Law School alumni
United States Army Air Forces soldiers
Businesspeople from Wisconsin
Wisconsin lawyers
United States Army personnel of World War II
Military personnel from Wisconsin
Republican Party members of the United States House of Representatives from Wisconsin
20th-century American politicians
20th-century American businesspeople
20th-century American lawyers